Patsy Jorgensen (born 24 March 1943 in Wairoa, New Zealand) is a lawn bowls competitor for New Zealand.

Bowls career
She won double gold at the 2000 World Outdoor Bowls Championship in Moama, Australia when winning the triples and fours events.

Jorgsensen also won a bronze medal in the women's fours at the 2002 Commonwealth Games. 

She won six medals at the Asia Pacific Bowls Championships including a 1999 double gold success in Kuala Lumpur.

Jorgensen won the 2003 fours title at the New Zealand National Bowls Championships when bowling for the Tauranga South Bowls Club.

References

Living people
1942 births
New Zealand female bowls players
Commonwealth Games bronze medallists for New Zealand
Bowls players at the 2002 Commonwealth Games
People from Wairoa
Bowls World Champions
Commonwealth Games medallists in lawn bowls
20th-century New Zealand women
21st-century New Zealand women
Sportspeople from the Hawke's Bay Region
Medallists at the 2002 Commonwealth Games